The Renaissance fleet is a set of intercity railroad cars owned and operated by Via Rail Canada.

History
The cars were built by Metro-Cammell in the mid-1990s for the proposed Nightstar overnight service between the United Kingdom and continental Europe via the Channel Tunnel. They are based on the British Rail Mark 4 design, but with heavy weight steel construction (by European standards) to meet safety requirements for the carriages to run through the Channel Tunnel.

In 2000, after the Nightstar concept was abandoned, Via acquired an initial three carriages for trials. In December 2000, the remaining 136 carriages were acquired, entering service in June 2002.

Accessibility 
The Council for Canadians with Disabilities successfully sued Via Rail in Council of Canadians with Disabilities v. VIA Rail Canada Inc. over the lack of accessibility of the Renaissance cars. The Canadian Transportation Agency ordered Via to retrofit some of the fleet to ensure the availability of accessible accommodations. Nevertheless, the Renaissance cars remain the least accessible in the fleet.

Car types 
Via acquired the entire original 139-car fleet; as designed it comprised 72 sleepers, 47 coaches, and 20 service cars. Via rebuilt fifteen of the sleepers into dining and baggage cars. Thirty-three carriages never entered service, remaining in store at Thunder Bay.

References

External links 
 

Railway coaches of Canada
Via Rail rolling stock
Train-related introductions in 2002